The 2006 Maryland Attorney General election was held on November 7, 2006. Incumbent Democratic Attorney General of Maryland J. Joseph Curran Jr. declined to seek a sixth term in office, prompted by his son-in-law, Martin O'Malley running for Governor and so wanting to avoid a conflict of interest. Montgomery County State's Attorney Doug Gansler won the Democratic primary to succeed Curran and faced off against Scott Rolle, the Frederick County State's Attorney who was unopposed in the Republican primary. Ultimately, Gansler defeated Rolle in a landslide and became the Attorney General of Maryland.

Democratic primary

Candidates
 Doug Gansler, Montgomery County State's Attorney
 Stuart O. Simms, former Baltimore City State's Attorney

Campaign
As Gansler and Simms rolled out campaigns for attorney general, they were joined by Montgomery County Councilman Thomas Perez, who raised hundreds of thousands of dollars, rolled out endorsements from unions, and aired television ads before the Maryland Court of Appeals ruled that he did not meet the requirements to appear on the ballot  as a candidate. Glenn Ivey, the Prince George's County State's Attorney, was rumored to be a possible candidate but ultimately declined to run. The Baltimore Sun announced its endorsement of Simms, declaring, "Mr. Gansler lacks Mr. Simms' breadth of experience and moderate temperament that is better suited for this critical role." In the end, Gansler was able to comfortably defeat Simms and was able to win every county in the state except for Baltimore County and Baltimore City.

Results

Republican primary

Candidates
 Scott Rolle, Frederick County State's Attorney

Results

General election

Polling

Results

References

attorney gen
Maryland
Maryland Attorney General elections